is a single by the pop vocalist Kimeru and was used as the fourth and final closing theme for the Japanese dub of the 2003 Ninja Turtles series. It was written and composed by "ROLLY". It was released by Nippon Crown Records in maxi and CD/DVD combo formats on January 23, 2008 in Japan only and is coupled with the song "Love Touch". The song would peak at 80 on Oricon.

Track listing 
恋してキメル!Koishite Kimeru!/Kimeru is in Love!
ラブタッチRabu Tacchi/Love Touch
恋してキメル!(instrumental)Koishite Kimeru! (instrumental)/Kimeru is in Love! (Instrumental)
ラブタッチ(instrumental)Rabu Tacchi (instrumental)/Love Touch (Instrumental)

References

External links 
A type Page at Official Site
B type Page at Official Site

2008 singles
Teenage Mutant Ninja Turtles music
2008 songs